Su Yiran (5 November 1918 – 7 June 2021) was a Chinese revolutionary and politician. He served as party chief of Shandong from 1982 to 1985, and governor of Shandong from 1979 to 1982. He was a member of the 11th and 12th Central Committee of the Chinese Communist Party. He was a delegate to the 10th National Congress of the Chinese Communist Party.

Biography
He joined the Communist revolution in June 1933. He joined the Communist Youth League of China in February 1936 and the Chinese Communist Party in January 1937. During the Chinese Civil War, he took part in the Long March. After he arrived in Yan'an, Shaanxi, he was accepted to the Central Party School of the Chinese Communist Party and Yan'an Marxism Leninism College. In 1939, he was transferred to north China's Hebei province, he successively served as deputy party chief and party chief of Laiyuan County, Mancheng County, and Wan County, and director of Zhangjiakou Public Security Bureau.

After the founding of the Communist State in 1949, he was appointed director of Anhui Public Security Department. In April 1955, he became a member of the Standing Committee of the CPC Anhui Provincial Committee. He was vice governor of Anhui in May 1956 before being assigned to the similar position in the neighboring Shandong province in 1960. In 1966, Mao Zedong launched the Cultural Revolution, he suffered political persecution. In June 1970, he was reinstated as vice governor of the Shandong Revolutionary Committee. He served as deputy party chief of Shandong from April 1971 to January 1977, and party chief, the top political position in the province, from December 1982 to June 1985. He was governor of Shandong between December 1979 and December 1982. On 1 November 1987, he was elected a member of the Central Advisory Commission.

On 7 June 2021, Su Yiran died in Jinan, Shandong, aged 102.

References

1918 births
2021 deaths
People from Cangxi County
Central Party School of the Chinese Communist Party alumni
People's Republic of China politicians from Sichuan
Chinese Communist Party politicians from Sichuan
Governors of Shandong
Members of the 11th Central Committee of the Chinese Communist Party
Members of the 12th Central Committee of the Chinese Communist Party
Members of the Central Advisory Commission
Chinese centenarians
Men centenarians